Raphel Jerome Cherry (born December 19, 1961) is a former American football defensive back in the National Football League for the Washington Redskins and the Detroit Lions.  He played college football at the University of Hawaii.

In 1999, Cherry was convicted of first degree murder in the death of his wife.  He was initially sentenced to life imprisonment, but upon appeal of his conviction, his sentence was reduced to 30 years. Cherry's estimated release date is January 9, 2029.

References

1961 births
Living people
Sportspeople from Little Rock, Arkansas
American football defensive backs
Washington Redskins players
Detroit Lions players
Hawaii Rainbow Warriors football players
American people convicted of murder
American prisoners sentenced to life imprisonment
People convicted of murder by Arkansas
Prisoners sentenced to life imprisonment by Arkansas